Antergos is a discontinued Linux distribution based on Arch Linux. It includes the GNOME desktop environment by default but it could also employ the Cinnamon, MATE, KDE Plasma 5, Deepin, and Xfce desktops. It was first released in July 2012 as Cinnarch and by June 2013 it was ranked among the top 40 most popular distributions viewed at DistroWatch. The Galician word Antergos (meaning: ancestors) was chosen "to link the past with the present".

Development was ended on 21 May 2019, due to lack of time on the part of the volunteer developers. It was succeeded by EndeavourOS on 15 July 2019.

History and development
Initially the project began as Cinnarch and the desktop environment used by this distribution was Cinnamon, a fork of GNOME Shell developed by the Linux Mint team. In April 2013 the team adopted GNOME for future releases, beginning with GNOME version 3.6, due to the difficulty of keeping Cinnamon (which did not make it a priority to stay compatible with the latest GTK libraries) in the repositories of a rolling release like Arch Linux. The distribution was accordingly renamed to Antergos and released under the new name in May 2013.

Other changes in the default configuration of the system included: Nautilus replacing the Nemo file Manager, GDM replacing MDM (Mint Display Manager) as desktop manager and Empathy replacing Pidgin as the messaging client.

Starting with version 2014.05.26, Antergos partnered with the Numix project to bring Numix-Square icons and an exclusive Numix-Frost theme to the operating system.

On 7 March 2015, an Antergos Minimal ISO was made available, providing only necessary components for the installer to function.

On 21 May 2019 the developers announced the end of development for the project, citing lack of time to work on it. They explained, "Today, we are announcing the end of this project. As many of you probably noticed over the past several months, we no longer have enough free time to properly maintain Antergos. We came to this decision because we believe that continuing to neglect the project would be a huge disservice to the community. Taking this action now, while the project’s code still works, provides an opportunity for interested developers to take what they find useful and start their own projects."

The developers indicated that existing users will cease getting Antergos updates, eventually the Antergos repositories will be removed via an update and users will be left essentially running Arch Linux. The forums and wiki page were to be maintained for a maximum of three further months. As of 27 May 2020, their website is offline.

Installation
Antergos includes the Cnchi graphical installer, which boots into a GNOME desktop environment, but during installation gives the user the option to choose between GNOME 3, Cinnamon, Mate, KDE Plasma 5, Xfce, deepin and Openbox desktop environments. A network connection is required to begin the installation and to automatically update the Cnchi installer prior to installation.

Package management
Antergos releases operated on a rolling release schedule and utilized the Arch Linux official repositories and the AUR, along with Antergos's own software repositories. It was a Pacman-based distribution with a graphical installer.

Antergos by default does not include an office suite. However, since the earliest Cinnarch release, it has included the "LibreOffice Installer for Arch Linux" which makes it easy to select and download the required LibreOffice components.

Releases
The first ISO by the name of Cinnarch was launched on 7 May 2012, accompanied by a message in the Arch Linux forum notifying users of the release. The first version under the Antergos name was released on 12 May 2013.

See also 

 EndeavourOS
 Comparison of Linux distributions
 List of Linux distributions

References

External links
 Official website archives
 
Antergos at OpenSourceFeed Gallery

Arch-based Linux distributions
Discontinued Linux distributions
Linux distributions
Operating system distributions bootable from read-only media
Pacman-based Linux distributions
X86-64 Linux distributions
Rolling Release Linux distributions